The Journal of Clinical Orthodontics  is a monthly peer-reviewed medical journal covering the practical aspects of orthodontics and practice management. The current editor-in-chief is Neal D. Kravitz, DMD, MS. It was established in 1967 as the Journal of Practical Orthodontics, obtaining its current title in 1970.

Abstracting and indexing 
The journal is abstracted and indexed in MEDLINE/PubMed and CINAHL.

References

External links
 

Dentistry journals
English-language journals
Monthly journals
Publications established in 1967
Surgery journals
Orthodontics
Magazines established in 1967